The Mosaic Assemblage is a rock unit of the Pacific Ranges of the Coast Mountains in southwestern British Columbia, Canada. It is the namesake of Mosaic Glacier, which is drained by Mosaic Creek. This geological formation formed 140,000 to less than 90,000 years ago when porphyritic plagioclase-augite-olivine basalt and trachybasalt was erupted in valleys and on mountain ridges. These volcanic rocks form scoriaceous lava flows, breccias, volcanic bombs and pillow lavas.

The location of the Mosaic Assemblage is sparse, being present just north of the Lillooet River, south of and in upper Meager Creek and between Job Creek and Mosaic Creek. Because these four areas are well apart, each area probably has its own volcanic vents. Small patches of the Mosaic Assemblage overlie The Devastator Assemblage and form minor portions of the Mount Meager massif.

See also
Job Assemblage
Plinth Assemblage
Capricorn Assemblage
Pylon Assemblage
Volcanism of Western Canada
List of Cascade volcanoes
List of volcanoes in Canada

References

External links

Mount Meager massif
Volcanism of British Columbia
Geologic formations of British Columbia
Pleistocene volcanism